The Shire of Deakin was a local government area in the Goulburn Valley region, about  north of Melbourne, the state capital of Victoria, Australia.

History

Deakin was once part of the vast Echuca Road District, which was formed in 1864 and redesignated as Echuca Shire in 1871. (Echuca Shire should not be confused with the separate local government area of Echuca Borough, which was also established in 1864, and proclaimed a city in 1965. This borough covered only the Echuca urban area and the rural area immediately surrounding it.)

The Echuca Road District extended along the south bank of the Murray River, from Mount Hope Creek in the west to the Ovens River in the east. Following its redesignation as Echuca Shire, it lost the eastern two-thirds of its area through severances which created the Shires of Yarrawonga in 1878, and Shepparton in 1879. However on 10 October 1879, the shire gained a large area which was annexed from the Shire of Waranga. On 30 May 1892, the Moira Ward of Echuca Shire was annexed to Shepparton Shire (which had been renamed Shire of Numurkah in 1885), fixing the boundary between Numurkah and Echuca Shires at the Goulburn River. Following this, the eastern part of what remained of Echuca Shire (roughly the area east of the Campaspe River) was severed and incorporated on 20 April 1893 as the Shire of Deakin.

On 18 November 1994, the Shire of Deakin was abolished, and along with the City of Echuca, the Town of Kyabram, the Shires of Rochester and Waranga, and some neighbouring districts, was merged into the newly created Shire of Campaspe.

Wards

The Shire of Deakin was divided into three ridings, each of which elected three councillors:
 North West Riding
 North East Riding
 South Riding

Towns and localities
 Girgarre
 Kanyapella
 Ky Valley
 Mount Scobie
 Strathallan
 Timmering
 Tongala*
 Wyuna

* Council seat.

Population

* Estimate in the 1958 Victorian Year Book.

References

External links
 Victorian Places - Deakin Shire

Deakin